Fitri is one of the three departments  which make up the region of Batha in Chad. The capital is Yao.

Departments of Chad
Batha Region